The NWA Southeast Television Championship was a minor title in the National Wrestling Alliance's Alabama territory known as Southeast Championship Wrestling. It existed from 1977 until 1985.

Title history

See also
National Wrestling Alliance
Southeast Championship Wrestling

Footnotes

References

National Wrestling Alliance championships
Continental Championship Wrestling championships
Television wrestling championships
United States regional professional wrestling championships